The Best NWSL Player ESPY Award is an annual award honoring the achievements of an individual from the National Women's Soccer League (NWSL). It has been awarded annually since the first award at the 2018 ESPY Awards. It was not awarded in 2020 due to the COVID-19 pandemic.

Winners and nominees
 Player's team won the NWSL Challenge Cup   Player's team lost in the NWSL Challenge Cup

Statistics

Footnotes

References

External links
 

Awards established in 2018
ESPY Awards